Lipice is a village in the municipality of Brinje in Lika-Senj County, Croatia, located about  from Gospić. According to 2001 census, Lipice had 254 inhabitants, of which 100% were Croats.

History 
Lipice was first mentioned in writing in 1638.

Population 
The population of Lipice peaked in the early 20th century.

Populated places in Lika-Senj County